Ángeles González-Sinde Reig (born 7 April 1965) is a Spanish scriptwriter, film director and politician. She served as Minister of Culture of the Government of Spain from April 2009 until December 2011. Her appointment was received with anger and rejection by the Spanish Internet Community, due to González-Sinde's opposition to P2P file sharing and the alleged conflict of interest due to her ties to the film industry. A strict anti-piracy law enacted in Spain in December 2011 has become known colloquially as Ley Sinde, or the Sinde Law, as she was seen as the primary backer of the measure.

Biography
Ángeles González-Sinde Reig was born 7 April 1965. She is the daughter of the academy's founder, José María González-Sinde, Sr. Her brother, José María González-Sinde, Jr., is also involved in the film industry.

González-Sinde studied Classics at the Complutense University of Madrid and did a master's degree in Cinema Scriptwriting at the AFI Conservatory in Los Angeles.

She served as president of Academia de las Artes y las Ciencias Cinematográficas de España (AACCE) (Spanish Academy of Arts and Cinematographic Sciences) since 2006 until April 2009.

In April 2009, González-Sinde was appointed Culture Minister. This sparked a movement against her from the Spanish Internet users community, represented by the Asociacion de Internautas (Internet Users Association). They stated that she was unable to fulfill correctly the needs and obligations of her position because of a conflict of interest, as she had personal ties with businesses involved in the film industry and consequently would not be impartial. Moreover, Spanish law 5/2006 of April 10, 2006 regulates conflicts of interest among high-ranking positions in the Spanish government.

Filmography

Director
La suerte dormida (2003).
Madrid 11M: Todos íbamos en ese tren (2004)—«Como los demás».
Una palabra tuya (2008).

Scriptwriter

Awards
Goya Award for Best Original Screenplay, La buena estrella, by Ricardo Franco (1997).
Goya Award for Best New Director for La suerte dormida (2003).
Prize Turia for Best New Work La suerte dormida (2003).
XX Festival de Cine Español de Málaga, Best Script for Heroína (2005), by Gerardo Herrero.
Premio Planeta de Novela, runner-up for El buen hijo

References

External links 

1965 births
Living people
Complutense University of Madrid alumni
Government ministers of Spain
Women government ministers of Spain
Spanish women film directors
Spanish women screenwriters
21st-century Spanish politicians
21st-century Spanish women politicians
Culture ministers of Spain
21st-century Spanish screenwriters